Steven Paul Brown (born 15 January 1979) is a former Zimbabwean cricketer. A right-arm off break bowler, he played three first-class matches for Matabeleland during the 1999–2000 Logan Cup.

References

External links
 
 

1979 births
Living people
Cricketers from Bulawayo
Matabeleland cricketers
Zimbabwean cricketers